This is a list of the 20 woredas, or districts, in the Benishangul-Gumuz region of Ethiopia.

References

 Based from materials on the Central Statistical Agency website.

Benishangul-Gumuz Region
Benishangul-Gumuz